The Forrestal-class aircraft carriers were four aircraft carriers designed and built for the United States Navy in the 1950s. The class ship was named for James Forrestal, the first United States Secretary of Defense. It was the first class of supercarriers, combining high tonnage, deck-edge elevators and an angled deck. The first ship was commissioned in 1955, the last decommissioned in 1998.  The four ships of the class were scrapped in Brownsville, Texas, between 2014 and 2017.

Design 
The Forrestal class was the first completed class of "supercarriers" of the Navy, so called because of their then-extraordinarily high tonnage (75,000 tons, 25% larger than the post-World War II-era ), full integration of the angled deck, very large island, and most importantly their extremely strong air wing (80–100 jet aircraft, compared to 65–75 for the Midway class and fewer than 50 for the ).

Compared to the Midway class, the Forrestals were  longer and nearly  wider abeam, resulting in a far more stable and comfortable aircraft platform even in very rough weather.  When commissioned, the Forrestal-class ships had the roomiest hangar decks and largest flight decks of any carrier ever built. Because of their immense size they were built to a new, deep-hulled design that incorporated the armored flight deck into the hull (previous American design practice was to design the flight deck as superstructure). This was a very similar structural design as used on British "armored" carriers, and grew out of the requirement for such a very large carrier, because carrying the strength deck at the flight deck level produced a stronger and lighter hull. The Midway-class ships sat very low in the water and were poor sea boats through their long careers; they were very wet forward and their aviation characteristics were poor. The deeper Forrestal hull allowed the ships more freeboard and better seakeeping. The Forrestal-class carriers, like the Midway class that preceded it, were designed with armored flight decks.

Forrestal-class ships were the first examples of supercarriers and thus not quite a perfected design; their elevators in particular were badly arranged for aircraft handling. The portside elevator, a relic of the original axial-deck design, was especially poorly sited, as it was located at the fore end of the angled deck, in the landing path as well as the launch path of aircraft from the No. 3 and No. 4 catapults.  The subsequent  moved the portside elevator to the aft end of the angle and reversed the position of the island and the second starboard elevator, vastly improving aircraft handling. The sponson-mounted guns suffered from poor range and complicated firing arcs, and were located in very wet and thus nearly useless positions in the bow and stern. They were removed after only a few years and were later replaced by missiles and much later by close-in weapon systems (CIWS). The aft guns in Forrestal lasted until the fire in 1967, then were removed and eventually replaced by missiles in the mid-70s.

The original design of the Forrestal-class ships would have had a very small, retractable island; this design had numerous problems (the mechanism to raise and lower the island was never perfected before the angled deck was added to the design) and smoke fouling of the deck was expected to be a severe problem due to lack of adequate venting.  The redesign to an angled deck allowed a very large island, much larger than on previous carriers, giving unprecedented flexibility and control in air operations.

The most visible differences were between the first pair and second pair: Forrestal and Saratoga were completed with two island masts, an open fantail, and a larger flight deck segment forward of the port aircraft elevator; Ranger and Independence had a single island mast, a more closed fantail (as seen in all carriers since), and a smaller flight deck segment forward of the port aircraft elevator.

History
In the late 1990s, the US offered Brazil a Forrestal-class carrier, but the offer was declined on the grounds of significant operating costs; Brazil instead purchased the French aircraft carrier , which was renamed . All four ships have been struck from the Naval Vessel Register and have all since been scrapped.

Ships in class

References

External links
RFI Carrier Disposal 

Aircraft carrier classes
 
 Forrestal-class aircraft carriers
 Forrestal-class aircraft carriers